The Monte San Salvatore (912 m) is a mountain in the Lepontine Alps above Lake Lugano and the city of Lugano in Switzerland. The Monte San Salvatore funicular links the city with the summit of the mountain. The village on top of its peaks, Carona, is a popular destination to enjoy views over Lake Lugano and to walk through the exotic plants and flowers of Parco San Grato.

Gallery

See also
List of mountains of Switzerland accessible by public transport

References

External links
 Monte San Salvatore funicular railway web site
 Monte San Salvatore on Hikr
 

Mountains of the Alps
Mountains of Ticino
Lepontine Alps
Mountains of Switzerland
Mountains of Switzerland under 1000 metres